The 2018 Men's Beach Handball World Championships were the eighth edition of the tournament, held at Kazan, Russia from 24 to 29 July 2018.

Brazil won their fifth title by defeating Croatia in the final.

Qualification

Draw
The draw was held on 15 May 2018 at Kazan, Russia.

Seeding
The seedings were announced on 14 May 2018.

All times are local (UTC+3).

Preliminary round

Group A

Group B

Group C

Group D

Consolation round

Main round

Group I
Points obtained against teams from the same group were carried over.

Group II
Points obtained against teams from the same group were carried over.

Knockout stage
Championship bracket

Fifth place bracket

9–16th place bracket

13–16th place bracket

9–16th place quarterfinals

Quarterfinals

13–16th place semifinals

9–12th place semifinals

5–8th place semifinals

Semifinals

15th place game

13th place game

Eleventh place game

Ninth place game

Seventh place game

Fifth place game

Third place game

Final

Final ranking

Awards
MVP
 Bruno Oliveira

Topscorer
 Martin Andersen (149 points)

All-star team
Goalkeeper:  Mohamed Abidi
Right wing:  Lucijan Bura
Left wing:  Ivan Jurić
Pivot:  Attila Kun
Defender:  Thiago Barcellos
Specialist:  Bruno Oliveira

Fair play award

References

External links
Official website
IHF website

Beach World Championships
Beach Handball World Championships
Beach Handball World Championships
Beach Handball World Championships
Sport in Kazan
21st century in Kazan
Beach Handball World Championships